Donald is a given name and the name of several Irish and Scottish noblemen.

Donald may also refer to:

Places
 Donald, Georgia, a small town in the United States
 Donald, Wisconsin, an unincorporated community in the United States
 Donald, Victoria, a town in western Victoria, Australia
 Donald, British Columbia, Canada, a ghost town
 Donald (hill)
 Donny, a colloquialism used in Yorkshire to reference the town of Doncaster

People
 Donald (surname)
 Clan Donald, one of the largest Scottish clans
 Donald Trump, was the 45th president of the United States

Others
 Donald Land,  a family computer action game about exploring "McDonald Land" with Ronald McDonald
 /r/The_Donald, a subreddit dedicated to Donald Trump
 Donald and Douglas, a pair of fictional Scottish twin engines from Thomas the Tank Engine and Friends

See also 

 Don (disambiguation)
 Donnie (disambiguation)
 Doland (disambiguation)
 The Donald (disambiguation)
 Macdonald (disambiguation)